Armand Rural District is in Armand District of Khanmirza County, Chaharmahal and Bakhtiari province, Iran. At the census of 2006, its population was 14,320 in 3,016 households; there were 16,080 inhabitants in 3,906 households at the following census of 2011; and in the most recent census of 2016, the population of the rural district was 17,368 in 4,539 households. The largest of its 22 villages was Buger, with 2,775 people.

References 

Khanmirza County

Rural Districts of Chaharmahal and Bakhtiari Province

Populated places in Chaharmahal and Bakhtiari Province

Populated places in Khanmirza County